Sarah Elizabeth Clark (born 21 April 1965) is a British Anglican bishop. Since 2019, she has served as Bishop of Jarrow, the suffragan bishop of the Diocese of Durham in the Church of England. She was Archdeacon of Nottingham from 2014 to 2019.

Early life and education
Clark was born on 21 April 1965 in South Wales. She was educated at Abersychan School, a then grammar school in Abersychan, Pontypool. She studied sports science and history at the Loughborough University of Technology, graduating with a Bachelor of Arts (BA) degree in 1986. Her first career was as a civil servant, working in the Department of Employment from 1987 to 1995. She completed a Master of Business Administration (MBA) from Keele University in 1994.

Ordained ministry
Clark trained for ordained ministry at St John's College, Nottingham, an evangelical Anglican theological college. She also studied theology and completed a Master of Arts (MA) degree in 1997. She was made a deacon at Petertide 1998 (28 June), by Patrick Harris, Bishop of Southwell, at Southwell Minster, and ordained priest the Petertide following (3 July 1999), by Alan Morgan, Bishop of Sherwood, at St Mark's, Woodthorpe. 

After a curacy in Porcester, Nottingham, she was the Rector of  Carlton-in-Lindrick from 2002 until 2009.  She was the Area Dean of Worksop from  2006 until 2009; and the incumbent at Clifton until her appointment as Archdeacon of Nottingham. 

On 20 December 2018, it was announced that Clark was to become the next Bishop of Jarrow, the sole suffragan bishop of the Diocese of Durham. On 27 February 2019, she was consecrated a bishop by John Sentamu, Archbishop of York, during a service at York Minster.

References

1965 births
Alumni of Loughborough University
Archdeacons of Nottingham
Living people
People from Torfaen
Bishops of Jarrow
Women Anglican bishops
Alumni of Keele University
Alumni of St John's College, Nottingham
Welsh civil servants
Civil servants in the Department of Employment